Metaplusia is a genus of moths of the family Erebidae. The genus was erected by Harrison Gray Dyar Jr. in 1925.

Species
Metaplusia argyra (H. Druce, 1889) Mexico
Metaplusia trichodisca Dyar, 1925 Mexico

References

Calpinae